Harry A. Wheeler (May 26, 1866 - January 23, 1960), was president of the United States Chamber of Commerce. In 1914 he declined President Woodrow Wilson's invitation to join the Federal Reserve Board.

Biography
He died on January 23, 1960, in Los Angeles.

References

1866 births
1960 deaths
United States Chamber of Commerce people